The Foramen cecum, in dental anthropology, is a minor expression of the protostylid of the tooth. It is thus indirectly related to the five non-metric dental crown traits.  According to dental, biological studies, racially mixed populations have been discovered with deformed Foramen cecums, resulting in unique tooth groove patterns. Some dentists and scientists have hypothesized that Foramen cecums could in fact be a trait frequency exhibiting sexual dimorphism.

Fossas and pits located in the protosylid, a Foramen cecum, have seemingly become rarer and rare over time. Most populations suffer from furrows of the cusps; most, however, do not develop problems located in the protosylid.

Anthropology
Dental anatomy